Michelle Poteet Lisanti is an American television soap opera writer.

Positions held
Another World
Screenwriter: 1995 – 1996

Days of Our Lives
Head Writer: October 10, 1980 – October 20, 1981
Breakdown Writer: 1987 – 1994, June 11, 2009–present

Guiding Light
Screenwriter: 1984 – 1985

One Life to Live (hired by Lorraine Broderick)
Screenwriter: 2001 – May 18, 2009

Search for Tomorrow
Screenwriter: 1985
Co-Head Writer: 1985 – 1986

Sunset Beach
Associate Head Writer (entire run, 1997–1999)

Texas
Screenwriter: 1981 – 1982

HW History

Awards and nominations
Daytime Emmy Award
2008; Best Writing; "One Life To Live"
2012; Best Writing; "Days of Our Lives"

Nominations
2002 & 2006; Best Writing; One Life To Live
1996; Best Writing; Another World
1994; Best Writing; Days of our Lives
1985; Best Writing; Guiding Light

Writers Guild of America Award Nominations
2003 & 2005 season; One Life To Live
1997 season; Sunset Beach
1987, 1991 & 1993 season; Days of our Lives
1984 season; Guiding Light

External links
 
 ABC Daytime: OLTL

American soap opera writers
American women television writers
Year of birth missing (living people)
Place of birth missing (living people)
Living people
Women soap opera writers
21st-century American women